Anna Negri (born 9 December 1964) is an Italian film director and screenwriter.

Born in Venice, she is the daughter of the Marxist sociologist and political philosopher Antonio Negri. After directing several short films, Negri made her feature film debut in 1999 with In the Beginning There Was Underwear, that was screened in the "Forum" section at the 49th Berlin International Film Festival.  In the following years she worked in television, directing some episodes of the soap opera Un posto al sole  and several TV movies. In 2008 she directed the mockumentary Riprendimi, which entered the World Dramatic Competition at the 2008 Sundance Film Festival.

In 2009 Feltrinelli released her autobiography, Con un piede impigliato nella storia ("A foot stuck in History").

In 2018 she directs, with Andrea De Sica, the first season of Baby, an Italian original series produced by Netflix. In 2021 she directs, with Leonardo D'Agostini, the first season of Lunapark, a Netflix original written by Isabella Aguilar.

References

External links 
 

1964 births
Film people from Venice
Italian film directors
Living people
Italian screenwriters
Italian television directors